Skopia ("watch-place, lookout") may refer to several places in Greece:

Skopia, Elassona, a village in Elassona
Skopia, Evrytania, a village in Karpenisi
Skopia, Farsala, a village and a community in Farsala
Skopia, Florina, a village in Florina
Skopia, Serres, a village in Nea Zichni
Cape Skopia, a headland in Acarnania

Other
Skopia is also the Greek name for Skopje, and is often applied to the entire country of North Macedonia due to controversy (see Macedonia name dispute)

See also
 Vigla (disambiguation)